The following is a list of the 648 communes of the Nord department of the French Republic.

The communes cooperate in the following intercommunalities (as of 2020):
Métropole Européenne de Lille
Communauté urbaine de Dunkerque
Communauté d'agglomération de Cambrai
Communauté d'agglomération du Caudrésis et du Catésis
CA Douaisis Agglo
Communauté d'agglomération Maubeuge Val de Sambre
Communauté d'agglomération de la Porte du Hainaut
Communauté d'agglomération Valenciennes Métropole
Communauté de communes du Cœur de l'Avesnois
Communauté de communes Cœur d'Ostrevent
Communauté de communes de Flandre Intérieure
Communauté de communes Flandre Lys (partly)
Communauté de communes des Hauts de Flandre
Communauté de communes du Pays de Mormal
Communauté de communes du Pays solesmois
Communauté de communes Pévèle-Carembault
Communauté de communes du Sud Avesnois

References

Nord

Geography of Nord (French department)